The Gotcha Group LLC, doing business as Gotcha, is an electric bike and scooter-sharing company based in Charleston, South Carolina. Gotcha began operating bike share systems on college campuses in the United States and later expanded to scooter-sharing and other electric vehicles such as electric trike scooters.

History

Gotcha first offered dockless bike sharing systems on college campuses and certain housing developments, and later offered taxi-like rides in electric vehicles for select markets.  As scooters became popular, Gotcha expanded to scooters in some markets.  Citing caution about the long-term durability of light-weight two-wheeled scooters, Gotcha began expanding service to electric trike scooters which it believed were more durable, and would allow two riders at a time.

Gotcha continues to be based in Charleston, South Carolina, and also has offices in Los Angeles, Atlanta, and San Francisco.

Equipment and usage

Gotcha offers bikes, scooters, and rides in electric vehicles to various areas, and has announced electric trike service in certain areas. Because the company operates its bike and scooter share systems in conjunction with other organizations, the rates of service vary, but typically include a per-mile rate and sometimes an initial usage fee. In markets where rides in Gotcha's taxi-like electric vehicle service are available during certain hours of operation, rides are available at a flat-rate.

Locations

Colleges and Universities 

 Michigan State University
 Auburn University
 Southern Arkansas University
 Florida State University
 University of Florida
 Augusta University
 Savannah College of Art and Design Savannah campus
 Savannah College of Art and Design Atlanta campus
 Lewis University
 Northern Kentucky University
 University of Louisville
 University of Mississippi
 UNC-Chapel Hill
 UNC-Charlotte
 Binghamton University
 Mercy College
 University of Buffalo
 University of Georgia
 University of Oklahoma
 Washington State University
 Marshall University

Cities and Localities 

 East Lansing, Michigan
 Fort Lauderdale, Florida
 Sarasota, Florida
 Nashville, Tennessee
 Toledo, Ohio
 Charleston, South Carolina
 Rock Hill, South Carolina
 New River Valley (Blacksburg and Christianburg), Virginia
 Burlington, Vermont
 Tinker Air Force Base, Oklahoma

In addition to current areas of operations, Gotcha has announced service for the following localities and educational institutions: Little Rock, Arkansas; St. Augustine, Florida; Morehead State University in Morehead, Kentucky; Baton Rouge, Louisiana; Syracuse, New York and; Villanova University.

References

External links

Bicycle sharing companies
Scooter sharing companies
Kick scooters